Hardcore Jollies is the ninth studio album by the funk rock band Funkadelic, released on October 29, 1976 by Warner Bros. Records, their first album to be issued on a major label. It is dedicated to "the guitar players of the world." Originally, the first side of the album was called "Osmosis Phase 1" and the second side was "Terribitus Phase 2." Hardcore Jollies was released one month after Funkadelic's final album for Westbound Records, Tales of Kidd Funkadelic, which was recorded during the same sessions.

Hardcore Jollies was the last Parliament-Funkadelic studio album to include three of the original members of The Parliaments: Fuzzy Haskins, Calvin Simon and Grady Thomas. Though uncredited, Hardcore Jollies features instrumental performances by guitarist Eddie Hazel.

The album has been reissued on compact disc by Charly Groove Records and Priority Records.

Track listing

Side One
 "Comin' Round the Mountain" (George Clinton, Grace Cook) (released as a single-Warner Bros. 8309) - 5:56
 "Smokey" (Clinton, Garry Shider) (released as a single-Warner Bros. 8367) - 6:08
 "If You Got Funk, You Got Style" (Clinton, Bootsy Collins, Bernie Worrell) (released as the B-side to "Comin' Round the Mountain") - 3:07
 "Hardcore Jollies"  (Clinton, Worrell)  - 5:01

Side Two
 "Soul Mate" (Clinton, Cook) (released as the B-side to "Smokey") - 2:48
 "Cosmic Slop" [Live]  (Clinton, Worrell) - 6:30
 "You Scared the Lovin' Outta Me"  (Clinton, Glenn Goins) - 6:28
 "Adolescent Funk"  (Clinton, Michael Hampton, Worrell) - 4:18

Personnel
Vocals: George Clinton, Ray Davis, Fuzzy Haskins, Grady Thomas, Calvin Simon, Garry Shider, Glenn Goins, Gary “Mudbone” Cooper
Lead Guitar: Michael Hampton, Eddie Hazel
Guitars: Eddie Hazel, Garry Shider, Glenn Goins
Keyboards: Bernie Worrell
Bass: Boogie Mosson, Bootsy Collins, Jimi Calhoun on "Comin' Round the Mountain"
Drums: Jerome Brailey, Buddy Miles on "Comin' Round the Mountain"
This would be the last Funkadelic album to feature Fuzzy Haskins, Calvin Simon, and Grady Thomas.  They would leave because of money and other personal issues.
This is also the last of the two Funkadelic albums to include Glen Goins; although he would appear on two subsequent Parliament albums.

Cosmic Slop
This track is a live version of the 1973 song from the Funkadelic album of the same name and it was recorded at a rehearsal for the 1976 P-Funk Earth Tour (see Mothership Connection Newberg Session). This version uses a vocal introduction that was removed from the 1973 studio version, and it features prominent guitar solos by Michael Hampton. This version is widely considered to be the best early example of Hampton's guitar work.

Charts
 Album

Billboard (North America)

References

External links
 Hardcore Jollies at Discogs
 The Motherpage

Funkadelic albums
1976 albums
Warner Records albums
Albums with cover art by Pedro Bell